was a town located in Hashima District, Gifu Prefecture, Japan.

As of 2003, the town had an estimated population of 10,204 and a density of 1,272.32 persons per km2. The total area was 8.02 km2.

On November 1, 2004, Kawashima was merged into the expanded city of Kakamigahara and no longer exists as an independent municipality.

Notes

External links
 Official website of Kakamigahara 

Dissolved municipalities of Gifu Prefecture